Niren Ghosh  was an Indian politician. He was elected to the Lok Sabha, lower house of the Parliament of India from Dum Dum in 1980 as a member of the Communist Party of India (Marxist).

References

People from West Bengal
India MPs 1980–1984
Lok Sabha members from West Bengal
People from North 24 Parganas district
Communist Party of India (Marxist) politicians